Michael Lawrence Hart (born February 17, 1958 in Milwaukee, Wisconsin) is a former Major League Baseball outfielder.

Hart went to high school in New Berlin, Wisconsin at New Berlin Eisenhower Middle/High School. Hart also went to college at the University of Wisconsin-Madison

After three-plus seasons in their organization, he was released, and signed by the Twins, with whom he made his major league debut on May 8, 1984. He played in 13 games for the Twins, batting .172.

Hart spent  with the Twins' top farm team, the Toledo Mud Hens. In , he got a second shot at the majors with Baltimore, spending the last month and a half of the season as the Orioles' starting center fielder. He fared a little better: although he hit his first four major league home runs, his batting average was just .158. Hart was released by the Orioles at the end of the season, ending his professional career.

References

External links

1958 births
Living people
Major League Baseball outfielders
Minnesota Twins players
Baltimore Orioles players
Bellingham Mariners players
Wausau Timbers players
Lynn Sailors players
Spokane Indians players
Salt Lake City Gulls players
Toledo Mud Hens players
Rochester Red Wings players
Wisconsin Badgers baseball players
Baseball players from Milwaukee